Biographical Dictionary of the Common Law is a biographical dictionary concerned with legal biography, edited by A. W. B. Simpson and published in 1984 by Butterworths. Hines called it "valuable". Holborn described it as a "handy starting point". Tearle said it is "the best source to consult first". Clinch called it "invaluable".

References
Simpson, A W B. Biographical Dictionary of the Common Law. Butterworths. London. 1984. .
"Reviews" (1984) 128 Solicitors Journal 278 Google Books
"Book Reviews" (1985) 149 Local Government Review 579 (July 27) Google Books
(1990) 154 Justice of the Peace 613 (Issues 27–52, 22 Sept.) Google Books
"Reviews" (1999) The Law Librarian, vols 30–31, p 138 Google Books

Books about legal history
1984 non-fiction books
Biographical dictionaries